The elasticity tensor is a fourth-rank tensor describing the stress-strain relation in
a linear elastic material. Other names are elastic modulus tensor and stiffness tensor.

The defining equation can be written as

Summation over repeated indices is implied. This relationship can be interpreted as a generalization of Hooke's law to a 3D continuum.

A general fourth-rank tensor  in 3D has 34 = 81 independent components , but the elasticity tensor has at most 21 independent components. This fact follows from the symmetry of the stress and strain tensors, together with the requirement that the stress derives from an elastic energy potential. For isotropic materials, the elasticity tensor has just two independent components, which can be chosen to be the bulk modulus and shear modulus.

Definition 
The most general linear relation between two second-rank tensors  is

where  are the components of a fourth-rank tensor .

The compliance tensor  is defined from the inverse stress-strain relation:

The two are related by

where  is the Kronecker delta.

Unless otherwise noted, this article assumes  is defined from the stress-strain relation of a linear elastic material, in the limit of small strain.

Special cases

Isotropic 
For an isotropic material,  simplifies to

In an orthonormal Cartesian coordinate basis, there is no distinction between upper and lower indices, and the metric tensor can be replaced with the Kronecker delta:

Substituting the first equation into the stress-strain relation and summing over repeated indices gives

In this form,  and  can be identified with the first and second Lamé parameters.
An equivalent expression is

where  is the bulk modulus, and 

are the components of the shear tensor .

Cubic crystals
The elasticity tensor of a cubic crystal has components

Thus, a crystal with cubic symmetry is described by three independent elastic constants.

Other crystal classes 
The number of independent elastic constants for several of these is given in table 1.

Properties

Symmetries 
The elasticity tensor has several symmetries that follow directly from its defining equation . The symmetry of the stress and strain tensors implies that

Usually, one also assumes that the stress derives from an elastic energy potential :

which implies

Hence,  must be symmetric under interchange of the first and second pairs of indices:

The symmetries listed above reduce the number of independent components from 81 to 21. If a material has additional symmetries, then this number is further reduced.

Transformations 
Under rotation, the components  transform as

where  are the covariant components in the rotated basis, and 
are the elements of the corresponding rotation matrix. A similar transformation rule holds for other linear transformations.

Invariants 
The components of  generally acquire different values under a change of basis. Nevertheless, for certain types of transformations,
there are specific combinations of components, called invariants, that remain unchanged. Invariants are defined with respect to a given set of transformations, formally known as a group operation. For example, an invariant with respect to the group of proper orthogonal transformations, called SO(3), is a quantity that remains constant under arbitrary 3D rotations.
	
 possesses two linear invariants and seven quadratic invariants with respect to SO(3). The linear invariants are

and the quadratic invariants are

These quantities are linearly independent, that is, none can be expressed as a linear combination of the others. 
They are also complete, in the sense that there are no additional independent linear or quadratic invariants.

Decompositions 

A common strategy in tensor analysis is to decompose a tensor into simpler components that can be analyzed separately. For example, the
displacement gradient tensor  can be decomposed as

Component-wise,

This decomposition is irreducible, in the sense of being invariant under rotations, and is an important tool in the conceptual development of continuum mechanics.

The elasticity tensor has rank 4, and its decompositions are more complex and varied than those of a rank-2 tensor. A few examples are described below.

M and N tensors 
This decomposition is obtained by symmeterization and antisymmeterization of the middle two indices:

where

A disadvantage of this decomposition is that  and  do not 
In addition, it is not irreducible, so it is not invariant under linear transformations such as rotations.

Irreducible representations 

An irreducible representation can be built by considering the notion of a totally symmetric tensor, which is invariant under the interchange of any two indices. A totally symmetric tensor  can be constructed from
 by summing over all  permutations of the indices

where  is the set of all permutations of the four indices.

The difference

is an asymmetric tensor (not antisymmetric). It is also irreducible with respect to arbitrary linear transformations, that is, the general linear group .

However, this decomposition is not irreducible with respect to the group of rotations SO(3). Instead,  decomposes into three irreducible parts, and  into two:

This representation decomposes the space of elasticity tensors into a direct sum of subspaces:

with dimensions

These subspaces are each isomorphic to a harmonic tensor space . Here,  is the space of 3D, totally symmetric, traceless tensors of rank .

See also 
 Continuum mechanics
 Solid mechanics
 Constitutive equation
 Strength of materials

 Thermoelasticity
 Representation theory of finite groups
 Voigt notation

Footnotes

References

Bibliography

 
 

 

Tensor physical quantities
Continuum mechanics